Manoranjan Sur  was an Indian politician. He was elected to the Lok Sabha, lower house of the Parliament of India from Basirhat in 1989 and 1991 as a member of the 	Communist Party of India.

References

External links
 Official biographical sketch in Parliament of India website

India MPs 1989–1991
India MPs 1991–1996
Lok Sabha members from West Bengal
1918 births
2013 deaths
People from Basirhat